James III ( – ), known as James the Rash (or the Unfortunate), was King of Majorca from 1324 to 1344. He was the son of Ferdinand of Majorca and Isabella of Sabran.

Life
James was born in Catania, Sicily. Margaret of Villehardouin, James's maternal grandmother, fought to reclaim the Principality of Achaea from the Angevins of the Kingdom of Naples. Isabella died soon after the childbirth, and James was proclaimed Prince of Achaea under the guardianship of his father. Ferdinand invaded the Morea in an effort to bring the principality under his control, but was killed in the Battle of Manolada in 1316. Despite this setback, from 1331 the feudal lords of Achaea began to recognise the rights of James, and in 1333 the recognition was total, though the Angevin heirs of Philip I of Taranto continued to press their claim.

Upon the death of his uncle Sancho in 1324, James inherited the Kingdom of Majorca. His uncle Philip ruled the kingdom as regent until 1329. In order to establish friendly relations with the Crown of Aragon, he married Constance, daughter of Alfonso IV of Aragon. Though the kings of Majorca traditionally swore an oath of fealty to the kings of Aragon, James claimed that no king could have lordship over any other king. He patronised the University of Montpellier, which lay within his continental domains, and the legal scholars of that institution defended his rights as king.

On 9 May 1337 James promulgated the Leges palatinae, an elaborate code for his court and the first of its kind. For it he commissioned a fine illuminated manuscript in an Italian style, which he himself preserved when he lost his throne. He brought it to the Roman curia, then sold it to Philip VI of France.

In 1342 James refused to render the oath of fealty to his cousin Peter IV of Aragon. He was supported, however, by the doctors of the University of Montpellier and by Aragonese troubadour, Thomàs Périz de Fozes, who wrote a poem in his defence. In a short war he was driven out of Majorca by Peter, who reannexed the Balearic Islands to the Crown of Aragon. James died at the Battle of Llucmajor on 25 October 1349 while trying to retake the island.

Children
James and his first wife, Constance of Aragon, had two children:

James IV of Majorca (–). Married Joanna I of Naples.
Isabella of Majorca (–). Married John II of Montferrat.

James and his second wife, Violante of Vilaragut, had one child:

Esclaramunda of Majorca (unknown). Died shortly after her birth.

Ancestry

References

Bibliography

David Abulafia (1994), A Mediterranean Emporium: The Catalan Kingdom of Majorca (Cambridge: Cambridge University Press, .
Thomas N. Bisson (2000), The Medieval Crown of Aragon: A Short History (Oxford: Clarendon Press).
G. Kerscher, The first European ceremonial manuscript—Leges Palatinae—and its relevance for the Mediterranean area, University of Trier.
Marta Vanlandingham (2002), Transforming the State: King, Court and Political Culture in the Realms of Aragon (1213–1387), (BRILL).

Monarchs of Majorca
Counts of Roussillon
Counts of Cerdanya
Lords of Montpellier
Princes of Achaea
Aragonese infantes
1315 births
1349 deaths
House of Barcelona
House of Aragon
14th-century people from the Kingdom of Aragon